What No One Knows is a 2008 Danish political thriller film written and directed by Søren Kragh-Jacobsen, and starring Anders W. Berthelsen, Maria Bonnevie, Ghita Nørby, and Lars Mikkelsen. The film was produced by Nimbus Film.

Plot 
A young woman is found drowned on a winter night by the sea. The dead woman's brother, Thomas, discovers that her death is connected to their father, now deceased, and his work in military intelligence. As Thomas digs deeper into the case his family is brought into sudden danger.

Cast 
Anders W. Berthelsen – Thomas Deleuran
Maria Bonnevie – Ursula
Ghita Nørby – Ingrid Deleuran
 – Lange-Erichsen
 – Marianne
 – Liv
Lars Mikkelsen – Marc Deleuran
Sarah Juel Werner – Bea
Jonas Schmidt – Claus Jensen
 – Amalie
 – Tyrfing agent
Kim Sønderholm – Tyrfing agent
 – Truck driver
Sonja Richter – Charlotte Deleuran
 – Old lady
Baard Owe – Hemmingsen
 – Waiter
 – Margrethe
Vibeke Hastrup – Miss Lange-Erichsen
 – Voice in telephone

References

External links 
 
 
 
 

2008 films
2000s thriller films
2000s Danish-language films
Danish thriller films
Nimbus Film films
Films directed by Søren Kragh-Jacobsen
Films set in Denmark
Films shot in Denmark